C. M. "Tad" Smith Coliseum is an 8,867-seat multi-purpose arena on the campus of the University of Mississippi. Through the first part of the 2015–16 basketball season, it was home to the University of Mississippi Rebels men's and women's basketball teams, but was replaced by a new arena, The Sandy and John Black Pavilion, in January 2016. It has also hosted many concerts, including Widespread Panic in September 1995 and The Allman Brothers with Gov't Mule in November 1995.

From its exterior, it looks like a giant hub cap. The seats were replaced in 2001 with navy blue upholstered seats. In 2010 the Tad Pad was upgraded. Two ring displays are also part of the center hung structure and are able to show a variety of graphics, animations and statistical information. In addition to this upgrade, Daktronics provided a custom sound system for the newly renovated arena. The outside of the building includes red Mississippi brick and blue vinyl-covered steel siding. It is located to the southwest of the center of campus, west of Vaught–Hemingway Stadium and across the street from the Robert C. Khayat Law Center. A Confederate cemetery lies behind the building.

The building opened during 1965–1966 as Rebel Coliseum. It was renamed on March 25, 1972, to honor C. M. "Tad" Smith, former three-sport letterman, coach, and athletic director at the university.

The largest crowd ever at the building was on February 10, 2007, when 9,452 fans watched the Rebels defeat the No. 18 Alabama Crimson Tide.

Prior to the building of the Coliseum, the team played in Old Gym (now the Martindale Student Services Center), a 2,500-seat gym built in 1929.

In July 2014, Ole Miss broke ground on a new arena named The Pavilion at Ole Miss, which was completed during the 2015–16 basketball season. The final game for the men's team at Tad Smith Coliseum was on December 22, 2015, with the Rebels defeating Troy 83–80 in overtime. The final game overall was on January 3, 2016 when the Ole Miss women defeated Vanderbilt 55–52. The men's team opened the new arena on January 7 against Alabama, with the women's basketball team making their debut in the new arena on January 10 against Florida.

References

External links
 VIDEO: Virtual tour of Tad Smith Coliseum at Ole Miss
 TadSmithColiseum.com - Seating Chart, Photos, and views of the court

Defunct college basketball venues in the United States
Ole Miss Rebels basketball
Basketball venues in Mississippi
Buildings and structures in Lafayette County, Mississippi
Sports venues completed in 1966
1966 establishments in Mississippi
2016 disestablishments in Mississippi